Ceriporia amazonica is a species of crust fungus in the family Irpicaceae. Found in Brazil, it was described as new to science in 2014. The fungus is characterized by its salmon-coloured pore surface with angular pores numbering 1–3 per millimetre, and small ellipsoid spores (measuring 2–3 μm) that are among the smallest in genus Ceriporia. The type locality is Amapá National Forest, in the Brazilian Amazon, for which the species is named.

References

Fungi described in 2014
Fungi of Brazil
Irpicaceae
Taxa named by Leif Ryvarden